Zinman is a surname. Notable people with the surname include:

David Zinman (born 1936), American conductor and violinist
John Zinman, American film and television writer and producer
Jonathan Zinman, professor
Stella Zinman

See also
Zinman Furs, an American fur coat company